Ellis Lane is a suburb of the Macarthur Region of Sydney in the state of New South Wales, Australia in Camden Council.

History
The area now known as Ellis Lane was originally home to the Gandangara people of the Southern Highlands although the Muringong, southernmost of the Darug people, were also known to inhabit the area. In 1805, wool pioneer John Macarthur was granted 5,000 acres (20 km2) at Cowpastures (now Camden). Ellis Lane is still primarily a rural locality.

Governance
Ellis Lane lies in the south ward of Camden Council, currently represented by Chris Patterson (who is also the Mayor of Camden), Eva Campbell and Fred Whiteman. It sits within the state electorate of Camden, represented by Labor's Geoff Corrigan, the former Mayor of Camden, and the federal electorate of Macarthur, represented by Liberal's Pat Farmer, the former ultra-marathon runner.
Centennial Lane is a street off Ellis Lane and is a part of the Ellis Lane Suburb

Population
At the 2011 census, there were 808 residents in Ellis Lane. The most common ancestries in Ellis Lane were English 33.0%, Australian 27.3%, Irish 10.2%, Scottish 6.6% and Italian 4.3%. The top responses for religious affiliation were Catholic 37.9%, Anglican 31.8%, No Religion 8.9%, Uniting Church 5.3%, and Presbyterian and Reformed 3.2%. School Education (8.1%) was the major industry of employment and other major industries included Building Installation Services 4.9%, Medical Services 3.6%, Land Development and Site Preparation Services 2.7% and Residential Building Construction 2.2%. The median household weekly income was $1,916, a lot higher than the national median of $1,234. In Ellis Lane, 100% of the dwellings were separate houses.

References

External links
  [CC-By-SA]
  [CC-By-SA]

Suburbs of Sydney
Camden Council (New South Wales)